Maya Detiège (born 30 August 1967, in Antwerp) is a Belgian politician. She is a member of the Flemish social-democratic party. At the moment, she is a federal representative.

Family
She is the daughter of the former mayor of Antwerp, Leona Detiège, and granddaughter of Frans Detiège, also a former mayor of Antwerp.

External links
Official website

1967 births
Living people
Members of the Belgian Federal Parliament
21st-century Belgian women politicians
21st-century Belgian politicians